Erashal is a census town in Chandipur CD block in Tamluk subdivision of Purba Medinipur district in the state of West Bengal, India.

Geography

Location

Urbanisation
94.08% of the population of Tamluk subdivision live in the rural areas. Only 5.92% of the population live in the urban areas, and that is the second lowest proportion of urban population amongst the four subdivisions in Purba Medinipur district, just above Egra subdivision.

Note: The map alongside presents some of the notable locations in the subdivision. All places marked in the map are linked in the larger full screen map.

Demographics
As per 2011 Census of India Erashal had a total population of 5,332 of which 2,641 (50%) were males and 2,691 (50%) were females. Population below 6 years was 601. The total number of literates in Erashal was 4,153 (87.78% of the population over 6 years).

Infrastructure
As per the District Census Handbook 2011, Erashal covered an area of 3.7505 km2. It had the facility of a railway station at Kamdapasara 3 km away. Amongst the civic amenities it had 25 road lighting points and 458 domestic electric connections. Amongst the educational facilities it had were 4 primary schools, 1 secondary school and 1 senior secondary school. The nearest degree college was at Kismat Bajkul 6 km away.

Transport
Erashal is on Chandipur-Nandigram Road.

Healthcare
Erashal Rural Hospital at Erashal, PO Math Chandipur (with 30 beds) is the main medical facility in Chandipur CD block. There are primary health centres at Gokhuri, PO Majnaberia (with 2 beds) and Baraghuni (with 10 beds).

References

Cities and towns in Purba Medinipur district